Derensili Sanches Fernandes (born 28 May 2001) is a Dutch footballer who plays for Eredivisie club Utrecht and their reserves squad Jong Utrecht.

Career
Fernandes started playing for Neptunus before joining up with Excelsior Rotterdam youth academy. He was moved to Excelsior's senior squad early in the 2020–21 season, but remained on the bench and did not make his professional debut.

In October 2020 he moved to FC Utrecht from Excelsior signing a 2-year deal with an option to extend it to the summer of 2023.

Fernandes made his debut for Utrecht in the Eredivisie in a 5-5 draw against AZ Alkmaar on 28 January 2023.

References

External links
 

2001 births
Footballers from Rotterdam
Living people
Dutch footballers
Excelsior Rotterdam players
Jong FC Utrecht players
FC Utrecht players
Eerste Divisie players
Eredivisie players